The Clash were an English rock band formed in London in 1976 who were key players in the original wave of British punk rock. For most of their recording career, the Clash consisted of lead vocalist and rhythm guitarist Joe Strummer, lead guitarist and vocalist Mick Jones, bassist Paul Simonon, and drummer Nicky "Topper" Headon. 

Headon left the group in 1982 due to internal friction surrounding his increasing heroin addiction. Further internal friction led to Jones' departure the following year. The group continued with new members, but finally disbanded in early 1986.
The Clash achieved critical and commercial success in the United Kingdom with the release of their self-titled debut album, The Clash (1977) and their second album, Give 'Em Enough Rope (1978). Their experimental third album, London Calling, released in the UK in December 1979, earned them popularity in the United States when it was released there the following month. A decade later, Rolling Stone named it the best album of the 1980s. Following continued musical experimentation on their fourth album, Sandinista! (1980), the band reached new heights of success with the release of Combat Rock (1982), which spawned the US top 10 hit "Rock the Casbah", helping the album to achieve a 2× Platinum certification there. A final album, Cut the Crap, was released in 1985 with a new lineup, and a few weeks later, the band broke up. 

In January 2003, shortly after the death of Joe Strummer, the band—including original drummer Terry Chimes—were inducted into the Rock and Roll Hall of Fame. In 2004, Rolling Stone ranked the Clash number 28 on its list of the "100 Greatest Artists of All Time".

History

Origins: 1974–1976
Before the Clash's founding, the band's future members were active in different parts of the London music scene.

John Graham Mellor sang and played rhythm guitar in the pub rock act The 101ers, which formed in 1974. By the time the Clash came together two years later, he had already abandoned his original stage name, "Woody" Mellor, in favour of "Joe Strummer", a reference to his rudimentary strumming skills on the ukulele as a busker in the London Underground.

Mick Jones played guitar in protopunk band London SS, which rehearsed for much of 1975 without ever playing a live show and recording only a single demo. London SS were managed by Bernard Rhodes, a sometime associate of impresario Malcolm McLaren and a friend of the members of the McLaren-managed band, the Sex Pistols. Jones and his bandmates became friendly with Sex Pistols Glen Matlock and Steve Jones, who would assist them as they tried out potential new members. Among those who auditioned for London SS without making the cut were Paul Simonon, who tried out as a vocalist, and drummer Terry Chimes. Nicky Headon drummed with the band for a week, then quit.

After London SS broke up in early 1976, Rhodes continued as Jones' manager. In February, Jones saw the Sex Pistols perform for the first time: "You knew straight away that was it, and this was what it was going to be like from now on. It was a new scene, new values—so different from what had happened before. A bit dangerous." At the instigation of Rhodes, Jones contacted Simonon in March, suggesting he learn an instrument so he could join the new band Jones was organising. Soon Jones, Simonon on bass, Keith Levene on guitar and "whoever we could find really to play the drums" were rehearsing. Chimes was asked to audition for the new band and got the job, although he soon quit.

The band was still searching for a lead singer. Chimes recalls one Billy Watts (who "seemed to be, like, nineteen or eighteen then, as we all were") handling the duties for a time. Rhodes had his eye on Strummer, with whom he made exploratory contact. Jones and Levene had both seen him perform and were impressed as well. Strummer, for his part, was primed to make the switch. In April, he had taken in the opening act for one of his band's gigs—the Sex Pistols. Strummer later explained:I knew something was up, so I went out in the crowd which was fairly sparse. And I saw the future—with a snotty handkerchief—right in front of me. It was immediately clear. Pub rock was, "Hello, you bunch of drunks, I'm gonna play these boogies and I hope you like them." The Pistols came out that Tuesday evening and their attitude was, "Here's our tunes, and we couldn't give a flying fuck whether you like them or not. In fact, we're gonna play them even if you fucking hate them."“Five seconds into their first song I knew we were yesterday’s papers.” On seeing the Sex Pistols, Strummer came to the conclusion that the 101’ers and pub rock were over and punk rock was the future. 

On 30 May, Rhodes and Levene approached Strummer after a 101'ers gig and invited him to meet up at the band's rehearsal location on Davis Road. After Strummer turned up, Levene played "Keys to Your Heart", one of Strummer's own tunes.

Rhodes gave Strummer 48 hours to decide whether he wanted to join the new band that would "rival the clash." Within 24 hours, he agreed. Simonon later remarked, "Once we had Joe on board it all started to come together." Strummer introduced the band to his old school friend Pablo LaBritain, who sat in on drums during Strummer's first few rehearsals with the group. LaBritain's stint with the band did not last long (he subsequently joined 999), and Terry Chimes—whom Jones later referred to as "one of the best drummers" in their circle—became the band's regular drummer.

In Westway to the World, Jones also says, "I don't think Terry was officially hired or anything. He had just been playing with us." Chimes did not take to Strummer at first: "He was like twenty-two or twenty-three or something that seemed 'old' to me then. And he had these retro clothes and this croaky voice". Simonon came up with the band's name after they had briefly dubbed themselves the Weak Heartdrops and the Psychotic Negatives. He later explained the name's origin: "It really came to my head when I started reading the newspapers and a word that kept recurring was the word 'clash', so I thought 'the Clash, what about that,' to the others. And they and Bernard, they went for it."

Early gigs and the growing scene: 1976
After rehearsing with Strummer for less than a month, the Clash made their debut on 4 July 1976, supporting the Sex Pistols at the Black Swan in Sheffield. The band apparently wanted to make it on-stage before their rivals in the Damned—another London SS spinoff—made their own scheduled debut two days later. The Clash would not play in front of an audience again for another five weeks. Levene was becoming disaffected with his position in the group. At the Black Swan, he approached the Sex Pistols' lead singer, John Lydon (then going by Johnny Rotten), and suggested they form a band together if the Pistols broke up.

Hours after their debut, the band members along with most of the Sex Pistols and much of the rest of London's "inner circle" of punks showed up at Dingwalls club to attend a concert by New York's leading punk rock band, the Ramones. “It can’t be stressed how great the first Ramones album was to the scene … It was the first word of Punk, a fantastic record” (Joe Strummer). Afterward "came the first example of the rivalry-induced squabbling that was to dog the punk scene and undermine any attempts to promote a spirit of unity among the bands involved."  Simonon got into a scuffle with J.J. Burnel, the bass player of the Stranglers. A slightly older band, the Stranglers were publicly identified with the punk scene, but were not part of the "inner circle" centered on the Sex Pistols.

With Rhodes insisting that the band not perform live again until they were much tighter, the Clash rehearsed intensely over the following month. Strummer later described how seriously the band devoted itself to forging a distinct identity: "The day I joined The Clash was very much back to square one, year zero. Part of Punk was that you had to shed all of what you knew before. We were almost Stalinist in the way that you had to shed all your friends, or everything that you'd known, or every way that you'd played before."

Strummer and Jones shared most of the writing duties—"Joe would give me the words and I would make a song out of them", Jones later said. Sometimes they would meet in the office over their Camden rehearsal studio to collaborate directly. According to a later description of Strummer's, "Bernie [Rhodes] would say, 'An issue, an issue. Don't write about love, write about what's affecting you, what's important."

Strummer took the lead vocals on the majority of songs; in some cases he and Jones shared the lead. Once the band began recording, Jones would rarely have a solo lead on more than one song per album, though he would be responsible for two of the group's biggest hits. On 13 August, the Clash—sporting a paint-spattered "Jackson Pollock" look—played before a small, invitation-only audience in their Camden studio. Among those in attendance was Sounds critic Giovanni Dadamo. His review described the band as a "runaway train ... so powerful, they're the first new group to come along who can really scare the Sex Pistols shitless".

On 29 August, the Clash and Manchester's Buzzcocks opened for the Sex Pistols at The Screen on the Green, the Clash's first public performance since 4 July. The triple bill is seen as pivotal to the British punk scene's crystallisation into a movement, though NME reviewer Charles Shaar Murray wrote, "The Clash are the sort of garage band that should be speedily returned to the garage, preferably with the motor still running". Strummer later credited Murray's comments with inspiring the band's composition "Garageland".

In early September, Levene was fired from the Clash. Strummer would claim that Levene's dwindling interest in the band owed to his supposedly extravagant use of speed, a charge Levene has denied. Levene and Lydon would form Public Image Ltd. in 1978. On 21 September, the Clash performed publicly for the first time without Levene at another seminal concert: the 100 Club Punk Special, sharing the bill with the Sex Pistols, Siouxsie and the Banshees and Subway Sect. Chimes left in late November; he was briefly replaced by Rob Harper as the Clash toured in support of the Sex Pistols during December's Anarchy Tour.

The Clash were putting forward a radical left-wing message in their songs and interviews. They sang about social problems, such as career opportunities and unemployment, and the need for people to fight back against racism and oppression. "We’re anti-fascist, we’re anti-violence, we’re anti-racist and we’re pro-creative." (Joe Strummer, 1976) However, “I don’t believe in all that anarchy bollocks!” (Joe Strummer, 1976) "The important thing is to encourage people to do things for themselves, think for themselves and stand up for what their rights are." (Mick Jones, 1976)

The confrontation between Black youth and the Police at the Notting Hill Carnival in 1976, was important in the development of The Clash’s political stance. It directly inspired Joe Strummer to write "White Riot". Images of the Notting Hill Carnival riots would appear as The Clash’s stage backdrop, the back cover of their first album and be reprinted on badges and The Clash t-shirts.

Punk outbreak and UK fame: 1977–1979

By the turn of the year, punk had become a major media phenomenon in the UK. The New Musical Express declared "1977 is the year of The Clash."

On 25 January 1977, the Clash signed to CBS Records for £100,000, a remarkable amount for a band that had played a total of about thirty gigs and almost none as a headliner. As Clash historian Marcus Gray describes, the "band members found themselves having to justify [the deal] to both the music press and to fans who picked up on the critics' muttered asides about the Clash having 'sold out' to the establishment." Mark Perry, founder of the leading London punk periodical, Sniffin' Glue, let loose with what he would later call his "big quote": "Punk died the day the Clash signed to CBS." However, he changed his mind when he heard the "White Riot" single for the first time: "They're the most important group in the world at the moment. I believe in them completely. All I said about them is crap." As one band associate described it, the deal "was later used as a classic example of the kind of contract that no group should ever sign—the group had to pay for their own tours, recordings, remixes, artwork, expenses ..."

Mickey Foote, who worked as a technician at their concerts, was hired to produce the Clash's debut album, and Terry Chimes was drafted back for the recording. The band's first single, "White Riot", was released in March 1977 and reached number 34. The album, The Clash, came out the following month. Filled with fiery punk tracks that raged against the ruling establishment, the bosses, the police, alienation and boredom.  

The Clash also presaged the many eclectic turns the band would take with its cover of the reggae song "Police and Thieves". The group, from its earliest days, had been influenced by the subject matter, slogans and lyrics of this other rebel music. They often played reggae in rehearsals but recording “Police and Thieves” was an important step that was only taken after a lot of discussion within the group. Reggae would have a strong influence on The Clash throughout the group’s history. 

"Amidst the Sex Pistols' inertia in the first half of 1977, the Clash found themselves as the flag-wavers of the punk rock consciousness", according to music journalist and former punk musician John Robb. Though The Clash album charted well in the UK, climbing quickly to number 12, CBS refused to give it a US release, believing that its raw, barely produced sound would make it unmarketable there. A North American version of the album, with a modified track listing, was eventually released in the US two years later in 1979, after the UK original became the best-selling import album of the year in the United States.

Chimes, whose career aspirations owed little to the punk ethos, had left the band again soon after the recording sessions. He later said, "The point was I wanted one kind of life and they wanted another and, like, why are we working together, if we want completely different things?" As a result, only Simonon, Jones and Strummer were featured on the album's cover, and Terry Chimes was credited as "Tory Crimes". Strummer later described what followed: "We must have tried every drummer that then had a kit. I mean every drummer in London. I think we counted 205. And that's why we were lost until we found Topper Headon." Headon, who had played briefly with Jones's London SS, was nicknamed "Topper" by Simonon, who felt he resembled the Topper comic book character Mickey the Monkey. An excellent musician, Headon could also play piano, bass and guitar. The day after he signed up, he declared, "I really wanted to join the Clash. I want to give them even more energy than they've got—if that's possible"; interviewed over two decades later, he said his original plan was to stay briefly, gain a name for himself, and then move on to a better gig. In any event, Strummer later observed, "Finding someone who not only had the chops, but the strength and the stamina to do it was just the breakthrough for us".

In May, the band set out on the White Riot Tour, headlining a punk package that included the Buzzcocks, Subway Sect, the Slits and the Prefects. The day after a Newcastle gig, Strummer and Headon were arrested for stealing pillowcases from their hotel room. The highlight of the tour was the Rainbow theatre in London on 9 May. This was the first time The Clash had played a major music venue and the punks took the Rainbow by storm ripping up seats as the gig turned into a mini-riot. The Sun reported on the events with the front page headline “Punk Wreck”. The New Musical Express, while expressing serious concerns over the violence, declared that "The Clash are probably the best band in the country right now”. “That was the night punk broke … we were in the right place doing the right thing at the right time”(Joe Strummer).  

That same month, CBS released "Remote Control" as the debut LP's second single, defying the wishes of the band, who saw it as one of the album's weakest tracks. 

Headon's first recording with the band was the single "Complete Control", which addressed the band's anger at their record label's behaviour. It was co-produced by famed reggae artist Lee "Scratch" Perry, though Foote was summoned to "ground things" a bit and the result was pure punk rock. Released in September 1977—NME noted how CBS allowed the group to "bait their masters"—it rose to number 28 on the British chart and has gone on to be cited as one of punk's greatest singles. 

In October 1977, The Clash set out on the “Out of Control” UK tour. The tour was due to open at the Ulster Hall, Belfast but the insurance was pulled and the gig was cancelled at the last moment. This led to punks blocking the road outside the venue and a confrontation between the punks and the police, which became known as the “Battle of Bedford Street”. Compared to many other riots in 1970’s Belfast it was small scale but it was unique in that it was a non-sectarian “riot” of Protestant and Catholic punks.

In February 1978, the band came out with the single "Clash City Rockers". In a rare BBC TV appearance the group played "Clash City Rockers", along with "Tommy Gun", in a live performance on youth TV programme Something Else in early 1978. 

On 30 April, The Clash played the Rock Against Racism Carnival in Victoria Park, London. Late 1970s England had seen an increase in racist attacks and a growth in support for the far-right National Front. Rock Against Racism was launched to use music to counter racism and the rise of the far-right. RAR tapped into the radical politics and popularity of punk and reggae. X-Ray Spex, Steel Pulse, Misty in Roots, headliners Tom Robinson Band, and The Clash played to 100,000 people who marched through London and attended the RAR Carnival.

June saw the release of "(White Man) In Hammersmith Palais", which surprised fans with its reggae rhythm and arrangement. The song quickly became a firm favourite with Clash fans and was voted single of the year in the 1978 NME Readers' Poll.

Before the Clash began recording their second album, CBS requested that they adopt a cleaner sound than its predecessor in order to reach American audiences. Sandy Pearlman, known for his work with Blue Öyster Cult, was hired to produce the record. Simonon later recalled, "[R]ecording that album was just the most boring situation ever. It was just so nitpicking, such a contrast to the first album ... it ruined any spontaneity." Strummer agreed that "it wasn't our easiest session." Although some listeners complained about its relatively mainstream production style, Give 'Em Enough Rope received largely positive reviews upon its November release.  

Give 'Em Enough Rope got mixed reviews in the UK music press. But the album sold well with Clash fans and reached number 2 in the UK album charts. Despite the backlash from sections of the music press, NME readers voted Give 'Em Enough Rope the second best album of 1978 and The Clash were voted the best group in the same end of year poll. However, the album was not the American breakthrough CBS had hoped for, reaching only number 128 on the Billboard chart. 

The album's first UK single, the hard rocking "Tommy Gun", rose to number 19, the highest chart position for a Clash single to date. The Clash produced their first official music video, showing the group performing "Tommy Gun", to accompany the release of the single. In the video Joe Strummer wore a H Block t-shirt in support of the campaign for political status for Irish Republican prisoners. 

"English Civil War", which warned against the rise of the far-right in the UK, was released as the album's second single in February 1979 reaching number 25 in the UK Singles Chart. The B-side was a cover of the Toots and the Maytals' "Pressure Drop", once again illustrating the group’s reggae influences.

In support of the album, the band toured the UK supported by the Slits and the Innocents. The series of concerts—there were more than thirty, from Edinburgh to Portsmouth—was promoted as the Sort It Out Tour. The band subsequently undertook its first, largely successful tour of North America in February 1979.

The Cost of Living EP was released in May 1979. It featured The Clash’s cover of "I Fought the Law". The EP also contained the Clash-penned "Groovy Times" and "Gates of the West". The fourth track was a re-recording, and a longer version, of Capital Radio that was originally released as a special free offer by the NME.

Changing style and US breakthrough: 1979–1982

In August and September 1979, the Clash recorded London Calling. Produced by Guy Stevens, a former A&R executive who had worked with Mott the Hoople and Traffic, the double album was a mix of punk rock, reggae, ska, rockabilly, traditional rock and roll and other elements possessed of an energy that had hardly flagged since the band's early days and more polished production. The title of the track also happened to be heavily influenced by the BBC World Service call signal and the panic that resulted in the Three Mile Island nuclear scare. It is regarded as one of the greatest rock albums ever recorded. Its final track, a relatively straightforward rock and roll number sung by Mick Jones called "Train in Vain", was included at the last minute and thus did not appear in the track listing on the cover. It became their first US Top 40 hit, peaking at number 23 on the Billboard chart. In the UK, where "Train in Vain" was not released as a single, London Calling'''s title track, stately in beat but unmistakably punk in message and tone, rose to number 11—the highest position any Clash single reached in the UK before the band's break-up.

Released in December, London Calling hit number 9 on the British chart; in the United States, where it was issued in January 1980, it reached number 27. The cover of the album, based on the cover of Elvis Presley's self-titled 1956 debut LP, became one of the best known in the history of rock. Its image, by photographer Pennie Smith, of Simonon smashing his bass guitar was later cited as the "best rock 'n roll photograph of all time" by Q magazine. During this period, the Clash began to be regularly billed as "The Only Band That Matters". Musician Gary Lucas, then employed by CBS Records' creative services department, claims to have coined the tagline. The epithet was soon widely adopted by fans and music journalists.

Around the turn of the year, the band members attended a special private screening of a new film, Rude Boy; part fiction, part rockumentary, it tells the story of a Clash fan who leaves his job in a Soho sex shop to become a roadie for the group. The movie—named after the rude boy subculture—includes footage of the band on tour, at a London Rock Against Racism concert, and in the studio recording Give 'Em Enough Rope. The band was so disenchanted with it that they had Better Badges make buttons that declared "I don't want RUDE BOY Clash Film". On 27 February 1980, it premiered at the 30th Berlin International Film Festival, where it won an honourable mention.

The Clash had planned to record and release a single every month in 1980. CBS balked at this idea, and the band came out with only one single—an original reggae tune, "Bankrobber", in August—before the December release of the 3-LP, 36-song Sandinista! The album again reflected a broad range of musical styles, including extended dubs and one of the first forays into rap by a major rock band, following "Ant Rap" by Adam and the Ants, which had been released a month earlier. Produced by the band members with the participation of Jamaican reggae artist Mikey Dread, Sandinista! was their most controversial album to date, both politically and musically. Critical opinion was divided, often within individual reviews. Trouser Presss Ira Robbins described half the album as "great", half as "nonsense" and worse. In the New Rolling Stone Record Guide, Dave Marsh argued, "Sandinista! is nonsensically cluttered. Or rather seems nonsensically cluttered. One of the Clash's principal concerns ... is to avoid being stereotyped." The album fared reasonably well in America, charting at number 24.

In 1981, the band came out with a single, "This Is Radio Clash", that further demonstrated their ability to mix diverse influences such as dub and hip hop. They set to work on their fifth album in September, originally planning it as a 2-LP set with the title Rat Patrol from Fort Bragg. Jones produced one cut, but the other members were dissatisfied. Production duties were handed to Glyn Johns, and the album was reconceived as a single LP, and released as Combat Rock in May 1982. Though filled with offbeat songs, experiments with sound collage, and a spoken word vocal by Beat poet Allen Ginsberg, it contained two "radio friendly" tracks. The leadoff single in the US was "Should I Stay or Should I Go", released in June 1982. Another Jones feature in a rock and roll style similar to "Train in Vain", it received heavy airplay on AOR stations. The follow-up, "Rock the Casbah", put lyrics addressing the Iranian clampdown on imports of Western music to a bouncy dance rhythm. (The singles were released in the opposite order in the UK, where they were both preceded by "Know Your Rights".) The music for "Rock the Casbah" was composed by Headon, who performed not only the percussion but also the piano and bass heard on the recorded version. It was the band's biggest US hit ever, charting at number 8, and the video was put into heavy rotation by MTV. The album itself was the band's most successful, hitting number 2 in the UK and number 7 in the US.

Disintegration and break up: 1982–1986
After Combat Rock, the Clash began to disintegrate. Headon was asked to leave the band just before the album's release because heroin addiction was damaging his health and drumming. Chimes was brought back to drum for the next few months. The loss of Headon, well-liked by the others, exposed growing friction within the band. Jones and Strummer began to feud. The band opened for the Who on a leg of their final tour in the US, including a show at New York's Shea Stadium.

Though the Clash continued to tour, tension continued to increase. In early 1983, Chimes left the band after the Combat Rock Tour because of in-fighting and turmoil. He was replaced by Pete Howard for the US Festival in San Bernardino, California, which the Clash co-headlined, along with David Bowie and Van Halen. The band argued with the event's promoters over inflated ticket prices, threatening to pull out unless a large donation was made to a local charity. The group ultimately performed on 28 May, the festival's New Music Day, which drew a crowd of 140,000. They played behind a banner saying "The Clash Not for Sale." After the show, members of the band brawled with security staff. This was Jones' last appearance with the group: in September 1983, he was fired by Strummer and Simonon. Shortly thereafter, he became a founding member of General Public, but left that band as they were recording their first album.

Nick Sheppard, formerly of the Bristol-based band the Cortinas, and Vince White were recruited as the Clash's new guitarists. Howard continued as the drummer. The reconstituted band played its first shows in January 1984 with a batch of new material and launched into the self-financed Out of Control Tour, travelling widely over the winter and into early summer. At a striking miners' benefit show ("Scargill's Christmas Party") in December 1984, they announced that a new album would be released early in the new year.

The recording sessions for Cut the Crap were chaotic, with manager Bernard Rhodes and Strummer working in Munich. Most of the music was played by studio musicians, with Sheppard and later White flying in to provide guitar parts. Struggling with Rhodes for control of the band, Strummer returned home. The band went on a busking tour of public spaces in cities throughout the UK, playing acoustic versions of their hits and popular cover tunes.

After a concert in Athens, Strummer went to Spain to clear his mind. While he was abroad, the first single from Cut the Crap, the mournful "This Is England", was released to mostly negative reviews. "CBS had paid an advance for it so they had to put it out", Strummer later explained. "I just went, 'Well fuck this', and fucked off to the mountains of Spain to sit sobbing under a palm tree, while Bernie had to deliver a record." However, critic Dave Marsh later championed "This Is England" as one of the top 1001 rock singles of all time. The single has also received retroactive praise from Q magazine and others.

"This Is England", much like the rest of the album that came out later that year, had been drastically re-engineered by Rhodes, with synths and football-style chants added to Strummer's incomplete recordings. Although Howard was an adept drummer, drum machines were used for virtually all of the percussion tracks. For the remainder of his life, Strummer largely disowned the album, although he did profess that "I really like 'This Is England' and [album track] 'North and South' is a vibe." In early 1986, the Clash disbanded. Strummer later described the group's end: "When the Clash collapsed, we were tired. There had been a lot of intense activity in five years. Secondly, I felt we'd run out of idea gasoline. And thirdly, I wanted to shut up and let someone else have a go at it."

Collaborations, reunions and Strummer's death: 1986–present
After the break-up, Strummer contacted Jones in an effort to reform the Clash. Jones, however, had already formed a new band, Big Audio Dynamite (B.A.D.), that had released its debut late in 1985. The two did work together on their respective 1986 projects. Jones helped out with the two songs Strummer wrote and performed for the Sid and Nancy soundtrack. Strummer, in turn, cowrote a number of the tracks on the second B.A.D. album, No. 10, Upping St., which he also co-produced. With Jones committed to B.A.D., Strummer moved on to various solo projects and screen acting work. Simonon formed a band called Havana 3am. Headon recorded a solo album, Waking Up, before once again spiraling into drug abuse. Chimes drummed with a succession of different acts.

On 2 March 1991, a reissue of "Should I Stay or Should I Go" gave the Clash its first and only number 1 UK single. That same year, Strummer reportedly cried when he learned that "Rock the Casbah" had been adopted as a slogan by US bomber pilots in the Gulf War.

In 1999, Strummer, Jones and Simonon cooperated in compiling of the live album From Here to Eternity and video documentary Westway to the World. On 7 November 2002, the Rock and Roll Hall of Fame announced that the Clash would be inducted the following March. On 15 November, Jones and Strummer shared the stage, performing three Clash songs during a London benefit show by Joe Strummer and the Mescaleros. Strummer, Jones and Headon wanted to play a reunion show to coincide with their induction into the Hall of Fame. Simonon did not want to participate because he believed that playing at the high-priced event would not have been in the spirit of the Clash. Strummer's sudden death from a congenital heart defect on 22 December 2002 ended any possibility of a full reunion. In March 2003, the Hall of Fame induction took place; the band members inducted were Strummer, Jones, Simonon, Chimes and Headon.

In early 2008, Carbon/Silicon, a new band founded by Mick Jones and his former London SS bandmate Tony James, entered into a six-week residency at London's Inn on the Green. On opening night, 11 January, Headon joined the band for the Clash's "Train in Vain". An encore followed with Headon playing drums on "Should I Stay or Should I Go". This was the first time since 1982 that Headon and Jones had performed together on stage.

Jones and Headon reunited in September 2009 to record the 1970s Clash B-side "Jail Guitar Doors" with Billy Bragg. The song is the namesake of a charity founded by Bragg which gives musical instruments and lessons to prison inmates. Jones, Headon, and Bragg were backed by former inmates during the session, which was filmed for a documentary about the charity, Breaking Rocks. Simonon and Jones were featured on the title track of the Gorillaz album Plastic Beach in 2010. This reunion marked the first time the two performers had worked together in over twenty years. They later joined Gorillaz on their Escape to Plastic Beach Tour for the remainder of 2010.

In July 2012, Strummer's daughters, Jazz and Lola, gave a rare interview to discuss the upcoming tenth anniversary of their father's passing, his legacy and the possibility of a Clash reunion had their father lived. Jazz said "There was talk about the Clash reforming before he died. But there had been talk for years and years about them reforming. They had been offered stupid amounts of money to do it, but they were very good at keeping the moral high ground and saying no. But I think if Dad hadn't died, it would have happened. It felt like it was in the air."

On 9 September 2013 in the UK (and a day later in the US), the Clash released Sound System, a twelve-disc box set featuring their studio albums completely re-mastered on eight discs with an additional three discs featuring demos, non-album singles, rarities and B-sides, a DVD with previously unseen footage by both Don Letts and Julien Temple, original promo videos and live footage, an owner's manual booklet, reprints of the band's original 'Armagideon Times' fanzine as well as a brand new edition curated and designed by Paul Simonon and merchandise including dog tags, badges, stickers and an exclusive Clash poster. Both Mick Jones and Paul Simonon oversaw the project including the re-masters. The box set came in a package shaped as an 80s ghetto blaster. The box set was accompanied by 5 Album Studio Set, which contains only the first five studio albums (excluding Cut the Crap), and The Clash Hits Back, a 33-track, two-CD best of collection sequenced to copy the set played by the band at the Brixton Fair Deal (now the Academy) on 19 July 1982.

In a 3 September 2013 interview with Rolling Stone, Mick Jones discussed the band reuniting saying it likely would have never happened. Jones said "There were a few moments at the time I was up for it (Hall of Fame reunion in 2003), Joe was up for it. Paul wasn't. And neither, probably, was Topper, who didn't wind up even coming in the end. It didn't look like a performance was going to happen anyway. I mean, you usually play at that ceremony when you get in. Joe had passed by that point, so we didn't. We were never in agreement. It was never at a point where all of us wanted to do it at the same time. Most importantly for us, we became friends again after the group broke up, and continued that way for the rest of the time. That was more important to us than the band". Jones also stated that the Sound System box set was the last time he will ever be involved in the band's releases. "I'm not even thinking about any more Clash releases. This is it for me, and I say that with an exclamation mark." Jones said.

On 6 September 2013, the three surviving members of the classic lineup (Mick Jones, Paul Simonon and Topper Headon) reunited again for an exclusive BBC Radio 6 Music show to promote their legacy and the release of Sound System.

In an October 2013 interview with BBC 6Music, Jones confirmed that Strummer did have intentions of a Clash reunion and in fact new music was being written for a possible album. In the months prior to Strummer's death, Jones and Strummer began working on new music for what he thought would be the next Mescaleros album. Jones said "We wrote a batch – we didn't used to write one, we used to write a batch at a time – like gumbo. The idea was he was going to go into the studio with the Mescaleros during the day and then send them all home. I'd come in all night and we'd all work all night." Jones said months had passed following their work together when he ran into Strummer at an event. Jones was curious as to what would become of the songs he and Strummer were working on and Strummer informed him that they were going to be used for the next Clash album. On 6 April 2022, The Clash announced the re-release of Combat Rock, including demos with Ranking Rogers vocals titled ‘Combat Rock / The People’s Hall’. Two supporting singles were released, "Rock the Casbah (Ranking Roger)" and "Red Angel Dragnet (Ranking Roger)" with both having Ranking Rogers vocals. The re-release was released on 20 May 2022 to mixed reviews. 

On 11 November 2022, founding member Keith Levene died a month before the 20th anniversary of Strummer's death in Norfolk, England.

Politics
The Clash's music often expressed left-wing ideological sentiments. Strummer, in particular, was a committed socialist. The Clash are credited with pioneering the advocacy of radical politics in punk rock, and were dubbed the "Thinking Man's Yobs" by NME. Like many early punk bands, the Clash protested against monarchy and aristocracy; however, unlike many of their peers, they rejected nihilism. Instead, they found solidarity with a number of contemporary liberation movements and were involved with such groups as the Anti-Nazi League. On 30 April 1978, the Clash played the Rock Against Racism concert in London's Victoria Park for a crowd of 50–100,000 people; Strummer wore a T-shirt identifying two left-wing militant groups: the words "Brigade  Rosse"—Italy's Red Brigades—appeared alongside the insignia of West Germany's Red Army Faction.

Their politics were made explicit in the lyrics of such early recordings as "White Riot", which encouraged disaffected white youths to riot like their black counterparts; "Career Opportunities", which addressed the alienation of low-paid, routinised jobs and discontent over the lack of alternatives; and "London's Burning", about the bleakness and boredom of life in the inner city. Artist Caroline Coon, who was associated with the punk scene, argued that "[t]hose tough, militaristic songs were what we needed as we went into Thatcherism".

The title of Sandinista! celebrated the left-wing rebels who had recently overthrown Nicaraguan despot Anastasio Somoza Debayle, and the album was filled with songs driven by other political issues extending far beyond British shores: "Washington Bullets" addressed covert military operations around the globe, while "The Call-Up" was a meditation on US draft policies. Combat Rocks "Straight to Hell" is described by scholars Simon Reynolds and Joy Press as an "around-the-world-at-war-in-five-verses guided tour of hell-zones where boy-soldiers had languished."

The band's political sentiments were reflected in their resistance to the music industry's usual profit motivations; even at their peak, tickets to shows and souvenirs were reasonably priced. The group insisted that CBS sell their double and triple album sets London Calling and Sandinista! for the price of a single album each (then £5), succeeding with the former and compromising with the latter by agreeing to sell it for £5.99 and forfeit all their performance royalties on its first 200,000 sales. These "VFM" (value for money) principles meant that they were constantly in debt to CBS, and only started to break even around 1982.

Musical style, legacy and influence
The Clash are mainly described as a punk rock band. According to Stephen Thomas Erlewine of AllMusic, "the Sex Pistols may have been the first British punk rock band, but the Clash were the definitive British punk rockers". Later in their career, the Clash used elements of a variety of genres of music, including reggae, rockabilly, dub, and R&B. With their album London Calling, the band expanded their breadth of musical styles in the first double album of the "" period. The Clash's music has sometimes been described as experimental rock and new wave. They played reggae since their beginnings, covering reggae songs and writing their own; and incorporated lovers' rock into the London Calling album.

In 2004, Rolling Stone ranked the Clash number 28 on its list of the 100 Greatest Artists of All Time, and in 2010, the band was ranked 22nd on VH1's 100 Greatest Artists of All Time. According to The Times, the Clash's debut, alongside Never Mind the Bollocks, Here's the Sex Pistols, is "punk's definitive statement" and London Calling "remains one of the most influential rock albums". In Rolling Stones 2003 list of the 500 greatest albums of all time, London Calling ranked number 8, the highest entry by a punk band. The Clash was number 77 and Sandinista! was number 404. In the magazine's 2004 list of the 500 Greatest Songs of All Time, "London Calling" ranked number 15, again the highest for any song by a punk band. Four other Clash songs made the list: "Should I Stay Or Should I Go" (228), "Train in Vain" (292), "Complete Control" (361), and "(White Man) in Hammersmith Palais" (430). "London Calling" ranked number 48 in the magazine's 2008 list of the 100 Greatest Guitar Songs of All Time. In 2010, London Calling was one of ten classic album covers from British artists commemorated on a UK postage stamp issued by the Royal Mail.

Jake Burns of Stiff Little Fingers, the first major punk band from Northern Ireland, explained the record's impact:
[T]he big watershed was the Clash album—that was go out, cut your hair, stop mucking about time, y'know. Up to that point we'd still been singing about bowling down California highways. I mean, it meant nothing to me. Although the Damned and the Pistols were great, they were only exciting musically; lyrically, I couldn't really make out a lot if it ... [T]o realise that [the Clash] were actually singing about their own lives in West London was like a bolt out of the blue.
The Clash also inspired many musicians who were only loosely associated, if at all, with punk. The band's embrace of ska, reggae and England's Jamaican subculture helped provide the impetus for the 2 Tone movement that emerged amid the fallout of the punk explosion. Other musicians who began performing while the Clash were active and acknowledged their debt to the band include Billy Bragg and Aztec Camera. U2's the Edge has compared the Clash's inspirational effect to that of the Ramones—both gave young rock musicians at large the "sense that the door of possibility had swung open." He wrote, "The Clash, more than any other group, kick-started a thousand garage bands across Ireland and the UK ... [S]eeing them perform was a life-changing experience." Bono has described the Clash as "the greatest rock band. They wrote the rule book for U2."

While the Sex Pistols’ debut gig at Manchester’s Lesser Free Trade Hall has been acknowledged as the starting point of that city’s punk scene, The Clash’s first gig at Eric’s, supported by The Specials, served as a similar watershed for Liverpool. The gig was witnessed by Jayne Casey, Julian Cope, Pete Wylie, Pete Burns, Bill Drummond, Holly Johnson, Will Sergeant, Budgie, and Ian McCulloch, who went on to form Big in Japan, The Teardrop Explodes and Echo & The Bunnymen amongst other bands.

In later years, the Clash's influence can be heard in American political punk bands such as Rancid, Anti-Flag, Bad Religion, NOFX, Green Day, and Rise Against as well as in the political hard rock of early Manic Street Preachers. California's Rancid, in particular, are known as "incurable Clash zealots". The title track of the band's album Indestructible proclaims, "I'll keep listening to that great Joe Strummer!" Outside of rock music, Chuck D has credited the Clash as an inspiration for Public Enemy, in particular for the way their use of socially and politically conscious lyrics gained attention from the music press: "They talked about important subjects, so therefore journalists printed what they said, which was very pointed... We took that from the Clash, because we were very similar in that regard. Public Enemy just did it 10 years later". In 2019 Chuck D narrated Stay Free: The Story of The Clash, an eight-part podcast series produced by Spotify and BBC Studios.

According to biographer Antonio Ambrosio, The Clash's involvement with Jamaican musical and production styles has inspired similar cross-cultural efforts by bands such as Bad Brains, Massive Attack, 311, Sublime and No Doubt. Jakob Dylan of the Wallflowers lists London Calling as the record that "changed his life". Bands identified with the garage rock revival of the late 1990s and 2000s such as Sweden's the Hives, Australia's the Vines, Britain's the Libertines, and America's the White Stripes and the Strokes evince the Clash's influence. Among the many latter-day British acts identified as having been inspired by the Clash are Babyshambles, the Futureheads, the Charlatans, and Arctic Monkeys. Before M.I.A. had an international hit in 2008 with "Paper Planes", which is built around a sample from "Straight to Hell", she referenced "London Calling" on 2003's "Galang". A cover of "The Guns of Brixton" by German punk band Die Toten Hosen was released as a single in 2006. A version by reggae legend Jimmy Cliff with Tim Armstrong from Rancid was scheduled for release in November 2011. American-Irish punk band Dropkick Murphys released a cover of the song on Anti Heroes vs Dropkick Murphys in 1997.

In June 2009 Bruce Springsteen & the E Street Band opened their concert in Hyde Park, London, with "London Calling". The concert was later released on DVD as Bruce Springsteen and the E Street Band: London Calling – Live in Hyde Park. Bruce Springsteen, Little Steven, Dave Grohl and Elvis Costello performed the same song at the Grammys in 2003 as a tribute to Joe Strummer who died the year before. In 2009 Springsteen & the E Street Band even covered Strummer's "Coma Girl" while in 2014 and along with Tom Morello, they opened some of their shows on the High Hopes Tour with "Clampdown".

The band has also had a notable impact on music in the Spanish-speaking world. In 1997, a Clash tribute album featuring performances by Buenos Aires punk bands was released. Many rock en español bands such as Todos Tus Muertos, Café Tacuba, Maldita Vecindad, Los Prisioneros, Tijuana No, and Attaque 77 are indebted to the Clash. Argentina's Los Fabulosos Cadillacs covered "Should I Stay or Should I Go", London Callings "Revolution Rock" and "The Guns of Brixton" and invited Mick Jones to sing on their song "Mal Bicho". The Clash's influence is similarly reflected in Paris-founded Mano Negra's politicised lyrics and fusion of musical styles.

The band's 1982 hit, "Should I Stay or Should I Go", is featured in multiple episodes of the 2016 Netflix sci-fi drama series, Stranger Things, which is set in 1983. London Town, a film which tells the story of a Clash-obsessed teenager who crosses paths with Joe Strummer by happenstance in 1979 and finds his life changing as a result, was released in 2016.

In March 2022, surviving members of The Clash gave permission to Ukrainian punk band Beton, which means "concrete" in Ukrainian, to rewrite the lyrics to London Calling. The song was produced in the wake of Russia's invasion of Ukraine, and mixed in Los Angeles by music producer Danny Saber. All proceeds from the song were designated to help fund war efforts.

Band membersClassic lineup (1977–1982) Joe Strummer – lead and backing vocals, rhythm guitar (1976–1986; died 2002)
 Mick Jones – lead guitar, lead and backing vocals (1976–1983)
 Paul Simonon – bass guitar, backing and lead vocals (1976–1986)
 Nicky "Topper" Headon – drums, percussion (1977–1982)Other members Terry Chimes – drums (1976, 1977, 1982–83)
 Rob Harper – drums (1976–77)
 Pete Howard – drums (1983–86)
 Keith Levene – guitar (1976; died 2022)
 Nick Sheppard – lead guitar, backing and lead vocals (1983–86)
 Vince White – rhythm guitar (1983–86)

Discography

 The Clash (1977)
 Give 'Em Enough Rope (1978)
 London Calling (1979)
 Sandinista! (1980)
 Combat Rock (1982)
 Cut the Crap (1985)

See also
 Album era
 The Clash on film
 John Richards, KEXP radio personality, created International Clash Day' on 7 February 2013.

References

Sources

  
  
  
  
  
  
 Egan, Sean (2014). The Clash: The Only Band That Mattered. Maryland: Rowman & Littlefield. .
 
  
  
  
  
  
  
  
  
  
  
  
  

Further reading

 
 
 Egan, Sean (2014). The Clash: The Only Band That Mattered''. Maryland: Rowman & Littlefield. .

External links

 The Clash Website
 
 
 
 
 Legacy Recordings Official Site
 Documentary of The Clash on YouTube by Google Play
 The Clash: London Calling exhibit

 
1976 establishments in England
1986 disestablishments in England
CBS Records artists
English buskers
English experimental rock groups
English new wave musical groups
English post-punk music groups
English punk rock groups
English socialists
Grammy Award winners
Musical groups disestablished in 1986
Musical groups established in 1976
Musical groups from London
Musical quartets
Political music groups